Having a Wild Weekend is the sixth American album by the British band the Dave Clark Five. It was presented as the soundtrack to the film of the same name, released in the UK as Catch Us If You Can. The album reached the Top 20 on the Billboard and contains the worldwide hit single "Catch Us If You Can".

Overview
The film Having a Wild Weekend was the directorial debut of John Boorman and combined social drama with light-hearted fun in the vein of the Beatles' A Hard Day's Night. Although the album (as well as the UK version) was presented as the soundtrack to the film, only the four songs that actually appeared in the film are included here ("Having a Wild Weekend", "Catch Us If You Can", "Sweet Memories" and "On The Move"). The other songs from the film were already released on the band's previous albums.

Release
 
The album was produced by Dave Clark and all songs were written by the band members. It came out in the summer 1965 on the Epic Records label in both mono (LN 24162) and electronic stereo versions (BN 26162). With different artwork but the same title, it was also released in Canada. The sleeve note was written by Myles Eiten of Ingenue magazine. The album cover art featured the band in a scene from the film with actress Barbara Ferris. On the back of the cover was the band captured in costumes of famous people (again from the movie scene). Dave Clark as Groucho Marx, Mike Smith as Jean Harlow, Rick Huxley as Stan Laurel, Denis Payton as Sabu (only Lenny Davidson is dressed as an anonymous "bathing belle").

The album was a huge success upon release, returning the group to the Billboard Top 20 (No. 15) and Cashbox (No. 11). The album's pilot single was the song "Catch Us If You Can", which became a worldwide hit.

Track listing

Songs in the film
The British soundtrack was called "Catch Us If You Can", but contained mostly different songs than the American album. Here is the actual list of songs used in the film and the albums on which the songs were released.

Personnel
The Dave Clark Five
Dave Clark - drums, backing vocals
Mike Smith - keyboards, lead vocals
Lenny Davidson - electric guitars, backing vocals
Rick Huxley - bass guitar, backing vocals
Denis Payton - tenor saxophone,  backing vocals

Additional musician
 Bobby Graham - drums (session drummer, not stated on the record sleeve)

References

The Dave Clark Five albums
1965 albums
Epic Records albums